Carnival Valor is a post-Panamax  operated by Carnival Cruise Line. The vessel was built by Fincantieri at its Monfalcone shipyard in Friuli-Venezia Giulia (northern Italy). She was floated out on March 27, 2004, and christened by American journalist Katie Couric in Miami on December 17, 2004.

History
The  vessel can hold up to 1,180 crew members and 2,974 guests. The ship's homeport is New Orleans, Louisiana.

Carnival Valor sails 4 and 5-night itineraries to the Caribbean. Some of Carnival Valors public areas were refurbished during a drydock from April 23 through May 8, 2016. In 2017, the ship earned a perfect health score of 100 from the Centers for Disease Control and Prevention. It was part of the agency's Vessel Sanitation Program, whose purpose is to prevent the transmission and spread of gastrointestinal disease.

On February 13, 2020, a rock music-themed cruise, known as ShipRocked, took place onboard Carnival Valor. Performers included Lzzy Hale and her band Halestorm, Alter Bridge, and Beartooth.

Port calls
On September 4, 2018, due to heavy rain and flooding in Galveston, Texas, Carnival Valors departure was delayed.

On January 23, 2019, the ship lost power at sea for an hour when she left Galveston on her way to Cozumel. On July 11, 2019, the ship docked in Mobile, Alabama instead of New Orleans due to a tropical storm.

On April 3, 2020, the ship along with other three cruise ships departed from the port of Gulfport, Mississippi after Governor Tate Reeves announced a “shelter-in-place” order to contain the spread of coronavirus.

Incidents
A crewmember broke his back onboard Carnival Valor in 2014. In September 2018, a Monaco judge ruled that Carnival should pay the crewmember $1.4 million, but the company refused to pay. The crewmember then took the company to a U.S. Federal court in Miami which ruled in his favor; the crewmember won the suit.

On August 3, 2017, the ship contacted the Houston-Galveston Coast Guard station and requested assistance for a woman who was injured from a fall. She was then medically evacuated by helicopter near Galveston after the ship left port for Cozumel.

On October 10, 2019, a 23-year-old male passenger was critically injured when he fell from where he was sitting onto a lower deck. He was medically transported by a Coast Guard Eurocopter MH-65 Dolphin from New Orleans.

On December 22, 2021, a 53-year-old man started experiencing stroke-like symptoms.

On 24 November 2022, a 28 year old man fell overboard 20 miles off Louisiana in the Gulf of Mexico. He was found and rescued by a United States Coast Guard helicopter over 15 hours later.

Coronavirus pandemic 
During the coronavirus pandemic, the CDC reported, as early as April 22, 2020, that at least one person tested positive for SARS-CoV-2 after disembarking. On March 15, a 49-year-old man from Ohio tested positive with COVID-19 after displaying symptoms. On April 8, 300 crew members who tested negative for COVID-19 disembarked at the Port of New Orleans.

References

External links 

Photos
Fincantieri Info Sheet

2004 ships
Valor
Ships built in Monfalcone
Ships built by Fincantieri